Santa Rita Airport  is a rural airstrip serving the lightly populated pampa region of the Beni Department of Bolivia.

See also

Transport in Bolivia
List of airports in Bolivia

References

External links 
OpenStreetMap - Santa Rita Airport
OurAirports - Santa Rita
Fallingrain - Santa Rita Airport
Google Maps - Santa Rita Airport

Airports in Beni Department